Friedrich Wilhelm Kritzinger (14 April 189025 April 1947) was a German official and state secretary in the Reich Chancellery during the period of Nazi Germany. He was the deputy head of the Reich Chancellery under Hans Lammers, and was Lammers' representative to the January 1942 Wannsee Conference, at which the genocidal Final Solution to the Jewish Question was planned.

Early life
Kritzinger was born as a son of a pastor in Grünfier, in the Prussian province of Posen (now Zielonowo near Wieleń, Poland). He received his Abitur in 1908 and studied law. During 1914–1918 Kritzinger served in the German military, reaching the rank of lieutenant in the reserve. In 1921 he passed the bar examination and then worked as an assistant in the Reich Ministry of Justice. In 1925–26 he worked in the Prussian Ministry of Commerce and in 1926 moved back to the Ministry of Justice.

Nazi era
Kritzinger joined the Nazi Party in 1938. In February 1938 Kritzinger was transferred to the Reich Chancellery, as head of the Division B with the official designation of a Permanent Secretary. In early 1942 Kritzinger was promoted to State Secretary.

Kritzinger was one of the participants at the Wannsee Conference, which established the policies of The Final Solution. Following the conference, he attempted to resign his position in the Chancellery, but his resignation was refused on the grounds that "it would be worse without him". It is speculated by historians that he may have openly and vocally opposed the Wannsee protocols, which would have explained his resignation, but no accurate historical record exists to support or confirm such speculation. Hans Mommsen claims that Kritzinger did not see the Wannsee Conference as shocking or consequential.

Arrest, trial, and death
Kritzinger was eventually arrested, along with most of the other surviving members of the Wannsee Conference, in 1946. During the Nuremberg Trials, where he was a witness, he publicly declared himself ashamed of the atrocities committed by the Nazi regime. He was released in April 1946 but then arrested again in December of the same year. Due to health-related reasons he was released again shortly thereafter and died of natural causes after a short period.

Fictional portrayals
Kritzinger was portrayed by Franz Rudnick in the 1984 film Wannseekonferenz, and again by David Threlfall in the 2001 BBC/HBO film Conspiracy.

References

 House of the Wannsee Conference; page accessed 19 January 2013

1890 births
1947 deaths
People from Wieleń
Nazi Party politicians
Nazi Party officials
People from the Province of Posen